Joe Rogers Jr. (born 1950/1951) is an American businessman, and the chairman and former CEO of Waffle House, a franchise restaurant chain co-founded by his father Joe Rogers Sr.

Early life
He was born in Jackson, Tennessee, the eldest of four children of Joe Rogers Sr. and his wife, Ruth Jolley Rogers.

Career
In 1973, Rogers was appointed CEO of Waffle House. He was succeeded in 2012 by Walter G. Ehmer.

Rogers is the chairman of Waffle House.

Personal life
In 2006, Rogers married Fran Maynard.

As of 2018, Rogers is involved in a sex tape case with a former housekeeper, and is counter-suing the defendant's lawyers.

References

Living people
American chief executives of food industry companies
Waffle House people
People from Jackson, Tennessee
Businesspeople from Tennessee
1950s births